In Western Christianity, the Transitus (translation from Ecclesiastical Latin: crossing) refers to "the time of passage through death to life". 

The Christian theologian German Martinez writes that:

Observance 
With reference to various Christian religious orders, liturgies for observing the Transitus may differ. 

Franciscans in general observe the Transitus of Saint Francis of Assisi on October 3, the eve of his feast. However, there is not a single liturgy for the Transitus among the different branches, and "therefore many expressions have developed" for this service.

See also 

Ablution in Christianity
Allhallowtide
Christian burial
Last Judgement

References 

Christianity and death
Christian worship and liturgy